Richard E. Berlin (1894-1986) was the president and chief executive officer of the Hearst Foundation.

Work
In his early career Berlin directed advertising for The Smart Set and McClure's magazines. In 1919 he joined the Hearst Corporation, where he stayed until his retirement in 1973. In 1941 William Randolph Hearst personally chose him as successor to his role. In 1942 Berlin became president of the company and after Hearst's death in 1951 he became chief executive officer.

William Randolph Hearst, Jr. claimed in 1991 that Berlin had suffered from Alzheimer's disease starting in the mid-1960s and that caused him to shut down several Hearst newspapers without just cause.

Personal life
Berlin's daughter was Warhol superstar Brigid Berlin.  He was also the godfather of writer A.J. Cronin’s youngest son.

Death
Berlin died in Rye, New York on January 28, 1986.

References

1894 births
1986 deaths
Hearst Communications people
People from Rye, New York